Michael Caton-Jones (born Michael Jones; 15 October 1957) is a Scottish director and producer of film and television. His credits include the World War II film Memphis Belle (1990), the romantic comedy Doc Hollywood (1991), the biographical drama This Boy's Life (1993), the historical epic Rob Roy (1995), the action thriller The Jackal (1997), and an erotic thriller sequel, Basic Instinct 2 (2006). He also directed the Channel 4 miniseries Brond (1987) and World Without End (2012).

Career
Caton-Jones grew up in Broxburn, near Edinburgh. He moved to London and squatted in Stoke Newington. He attended the National Film and Television School. In October 2017, he revealed he had chosen Sophie Okonedo, to star in B. Monkey. However producer, Harvey Weinstein, reportedly decided the actress was not "f**kable". Caton-Jones and Weinstein discussed the matter heatedly and Caton-Jones said, "'Don’t screw up the casting of this film because you want to get laid', whereupon he went mental." Weinstein then told Variety that Caton-Jones had left the production due to "creative differences". 

Asia Argento, who replaced Okonedo, was one of three women who in 2017 were reported in The New Yorker to have been raped by Weinstein; she said she submitted to Weinstein because, "I felt I had to, because I had the movie coming out and I didn’t want to anger him."

Filmography

Film

Television director

Awards and nominations

References

External links
 

1957 births
Living people
People educated at Wellington College, Berkshire
Alumni of the National Film and Television School
Scottish film directors
People from Broxburn, West Lothian
20th-century squatters